Cécile Breccia is a French actress and model best known for her role as Lt. Link Manion in the 2008 American military science fiction film Starship Troopers 3: Marauder. Her other notable films include 99 Francs (2007) and The Hills Have Eyes 2.

Biography
Cécile Breccia was born in Paris, to an Italian father (a documentary filmmaker specializing in history) and a French mother (an actress and painter).

At the age of 8, she began acting classes and later she studied drama at Cours Florent.

She first appeared in 2004  French action crime series Lea Parker. Her first major role came in Lionel Delplanque's 2006 drama thriller film Président.

Personal life
She has been in a relationship with Australian actor Jason Clarke since 2010. The pair have two sons born in 2014 and 2019, and in 2018 announced they had married.

Filmography

References

External links
 
 
 Jason Clarke & Cecile Breccia "Rebels With a Cause" Gala 2016 Red Carpet

21st-century French actresses
Living people
Date of birth missing (living people)
French female models
French film actresses
French people of Italian descent
French television actresses
Year of birth missing (living people)
Place of birth missing (living people)